Huang Yanpei (1 October 1878 – 21 December 1965) was a Chinese educator, writer, and politician. He was a founding pioneer of the China Democratic League and the China National Democratic Construction Association, which are among the eight legally recognised minor political parties in China under the Chinese Communist Party's united front.

Names 
Huang was also known by his courtesy name Renzhi and art name Chunan.

Early life 
Huang was born in Neishidi, Chuansha, Jiangsu (now part of Pudong, Shanghai) during the reign of the Guangxu Emperor of the Qing dynasty. His mother died when he was 13 and his father died when he was 17, so he lived with his maternal grandfather, who gave him a traditional Chinese education. In his young age, he studied at Dongye School and read the Four Books and Five Classics. Before he reached adulthood, he worked as an informal teacher in his hometown to support his family.

In 1899, Huang topped the imperial examination in Songjiang Prefecture, which covered much of present-day Shanghai, and obtained the position of a xiucai. He later received financial support from his uncle to read Western studies.

In 1901, Huang enrolled in Nanyang Public School (now Shanghai Jiao Tong University) and met Cai Yuanpei, who was then teaching the Chinese language there. One year later, Huang obtained the position of a juren in the imperial examination in Jiangnan. Some time later, he left school in protest against the expulsion of his fellow students, who had been expelled for allegedly showing disrespect towards a teacher by leaving an empty ink bottle on the teacher's desk – an act interpreted as suggesting that the teacher was unlearned because ink metaphorically referred to knowledge.

Huang then returned to Chuansha, where he set up a Chuansha Primary School for children. During this time, he read Yan Fu's Tian Yan Lun — a translation of Thomas Henry Huxley's Evolution and Ethics — and other books on Western ideas.

In 1903, while giving a talk in Nanhui District, Huang was accused of being an anti-government revolutionary, and was arrested and imprisoned. He was released on bail with the help of William Burke, an American missionary, and narrowly escaped death as he left the prison just one hour before an order for his execution from the Jiangsu provincial government reached the local government in Nanhai District. Huang fled to Japan and stayed there for three months before returning to Shanghai, where he continued to set up and run schools.

In 1905, Huang was introduced by Cai Yuanpei to join the Tongmenghui. At the same time, he established, ran and taught in various schools, including the Pudong Middle School, and also helped to set up the Organisation for Education Affairs in Jiangsu.

Life in the Republic of China 
After the Xinhai Revolution overthrew the Qing dynasty in 1911, Huang became the Head of Civilian Affairs and Head of Education in the Office of the Governor of Jiangsu. He later became the Secretary of Education and reformed education in Jiangsu, planning and setting up several schools. At the same time, he was also the vice president of the education society and a travelling reporter for the newspaper Shen Bao.

In 1908, Huang, Tong Shiheng and others founded Pudong Electric Co., Ltd. to provide electricity in Pudong. In 1913, he published an article, "Discussion on schools adopting a practical stance towards education", to express his thoughts on how education should be tailored towards pragmatism. Between February 1914 and early 1917, Huang, working as a reporter for Shen Bao, visited and observed various schools throughout China. In April 1915, he followed an industrial organisation to the United States, where he visited 52 schools in 25 cities and saw that vocational education was very popular there. He visited Japan, the Philippines and Southeast Asia to observe education in those countries. He made notes from his observations, compiled them and had them published.

In 1917, Huang travelled to Britain to observe the British education system. On May 6, 1917, with support from various businesses and the education sector, Huang founded the National Association of Vocational Education of China in Shanghai. A year later, he established the Chinese Vocational School. Over the next ten years, Huang remained active in the education sector, using the Chinese Vocational School to expand his activities. During the May Fourth Movement of 1919, he used his position as the Secretary of Education to rally support from the schools in Shanghai to disrupt classes and stage demonstrations.

In 1921, Huang was appointed Education Minister by the Beiyang government but he refused to accept the appointment. In 1922, he drafted the educational system and set up more schools. Five years later, he ran a Life Magazine to further publish his thoughts and ideas.

In 1927, when the Kuomintang was in conflict with the Chinese Communist Party, Huang was accused of being a "scholar-tyrant" – a term to describe those who attempted to expand their political influence through education – and had an order issued for his arrest. He escaped to Dalian and returned to Shanghai only after Chiang Kai-shek withdrew the order for his arrest.

Life during World War II 
After the Mukden Incident in 1931, Huang became worried about Japanese aggression towards China so he took part in anti-Japanese activities. He also set up a newsletter, "Newsletter on Saving the Nation", to publish his ideas and stir up patriotic sentiments among the Chinese. A year later, he sent a message throughout China, urging everyone to put aside their differences and unite to resist the Japanese.

After the January 28 Incident in 1932, Huang and other influential men in Shanghai formed the Shanghai Citizen Preservation Organisation to raise funds to support the 19th Route Army and preserve Shanghai's economy and security. Their activities lasted until Shanghai fell to the Japanese in 1937.

Following the outbreak of the Second Sino-Japanese War in 1937, Huang moved to Chongqing, the wartime capital of the Republic of China government, and served as a representative in the National Defence Council. A year later, he became a member of the People's Political Council. In 1941, he founded the China Democratic League with Zhang Lan and others and served as its first chairman. In 1945, he established the China Democratic National Construction Association with Hu Juewen and others and served as its first chairperson.

Life during the Chinese Civil War 
In July 1945, in an attempt to mediate the conflict between the Kuomintang and Chinese Communist Party, Huang, Zhang Bojun and others travelled from Chongqing to Yan'an to meet Communist leader Mao Zedong.

After returning to Chongqing, Huang wrote a book, Return from Yan'an, describing a conversation he had with Mao — widely known as the "Zhou Qi Lü" conversation. Huang had said, 

Mao had replied, 

During the Chinese Civil War, Huang resigned from the People's Political Council in protest against the war and returned to Shanghai, where he continued to set up and run schools.

Life in the People's Republic of China 
After the Chinese Communist Party established the People's Republic of China in 1949, Huang served a member of the Central People's Government, Vice Premier of the State Council, and Minister of Light Industry. He also consecutively served as the Vice Chairman in the second, third and fourth Chinese People's Political Consultative Conference.

Despite holding positions in the Communist government, Huang disagreed with some of its policies and was particularly opposed to state monopoly in purchasing and marketing. Mao Zedong even once called Huang "a spokesperson for capitalists". Nevertheless, Huang managed to retain his positions in the National People's Congress and Political Consultative Conference when the Chinese Communist Party started purging non-communist members from government bodies.

Death 
Huang died on December 21, 1965 in Beijing and was cremated and interred in the Babaoshan Revolutionary Cemetery.

Family 
Spouses
 Wang Jiusi (died 1940), Huang's first wife.
 Yao Weijun (1909–1968), Huang's second wife who married him in 1942. She was a university graduate and she helped Huang in writing the book Return from Yan'an. She committed suicide on January 20, 1968 by overdosing on sleeping pills.

Children
 Huang Fanggang (1901–1944), graduated from Carleton University and obtained a PhD in philosophy from Harvard University.
 Huang Jingwu (1903–1949), graduated from Tsinghua University and obtained a master's degree in economics from Harvard University.
 Huang Lu (；1907-2001), a teacher.
 Huang Wanli (1911–2001), a hydraulics professor.
 Huang Xiaotong (1913-1996), a teacher.
 Huang Daneng (1916–2010), served as the Vice Director of the Chinese Society for Vocational Education. He was also a technical specialist in concrete.
 Huang Xuechao (1920-)
 Huang Suhui (1923-)
 Huang Bixin (1925-1966), a college lecturer. He and his wife committed suicide during the Cultural Revolution.
 Huang Dangshi (1943-）
 Huang Dingnian (1944-), an engineer.
 Huang Fangyi (1946-), obtained a master's degree from Duke University. He worked in the Chinese Academy of Social Sciences and participated in research on economics at Beijing University. He is also a visiting professor at the Johns Hopkins University and Columbia University and is involved in Chinese politics.
 Huang Gang (1949-)

Grandchildren
 Richard Shih-chao Huang (1932–2004), Huang Fanggang's son. He was a rocket scientist in the United States.
 Huang Mengfu, Huang Jingwu's son. He is the Vice Chairman of the Chinese People's Political Consultative Conference.
 Huang Qieyuan (1939-2012), a mathematician.
 Huang Guanhong, Huang Wanli's son. He is a professor in Tianjin University.

Other relatives
 Huang Tzu (1904–1938), a musician. He was the son of Huang Hongpei, Huang Yanpei's cousin.
 Huang Peiying, a wool knitting specialist in China in the 1930s. She was the daughter of Huang Shihuan, a distant uncle of Huang Yanpei.

Appearances in media 
In 2010, CCTV-8 produced a 25-episode television series based on Huang Yanpei's life. It was titled Huang Yanpei and starred Zhang Tielin as the eponymous character.

Notes

External links 
 Huang Yanpei on shanghaiguide.org
 Huang Yuan-pei (Huang Yanpei) 黃炎培 from Biographies of Prominent Chinese c.1925.

1878 births
1965 deaths
Chairpersons of the China Democratic League
Chinese non-fiction writers
Educators from Shanghai
Members of the China National Democratic Construction Association
People's Republic of China politicians from Shanghai
People's Republic of China writers
Republic of China politicians from Shanghai
Republic of China writers
National Chiao Tung University (Shanghai) alumni
Vice Chairpersons of the National Committee of the Chinese People's Political Consultative Conference
Vice Chairpersons of the National People's Congress
Writers from Shanghai